Apart from the many Burmese movies which were filmed locally by Burmese directors and producers, several foreign movies have also been, at least partly, set in Burma. Only very few of them were actually shot on the scene, and most are set in Burma during World War II.

Foreign movies set in Burma
 A Maid of Mandalay (1913) - short movie based on Rudyard Kipling’s famous ballad ‘Mandalay’, filmed on location and starring Maurice Costello and Clara Kimball-Young
 The Road to Mandalay (1926)
 Mandalay (1934)
 The Girl from Mandalay (1936)
 Burma Convoy (1941)
 Moon over Burma (1940) - starring Dorothy Lamour
 A Yank on the Burma Road (1942) - primarily set on the China end of the Burma Road
 Bombs over Burma (1942)
 Rookies in Burma (1943) - the only Hollywood Burma comedy
 Burma Victory (1945) - British film
 Objective Burma (1945) - starring Errol Flynn
 Francis, a.k.a. Francis the Talking Mule (1950) - majority of the film is told in flashback describing the main character's involvement in the CBI Theater
 The Purple Plain (1954) - based on a novel by H.E. Bates; was actually filmed in Ceylon, now Sri Lanka
 Escape to Burma (1955)
 The Burmese Harp, a.k.a. Harp of Burma (1956) - Japanese movie directed by Kon Ichikawa, nominated for an Oscar in the Best Foreign Language Film category
 The Bridge on the River Kwai (1957) - British-American epic war film based on the building of the Burma Railway
 Never So Few (1959) - with Frank Sinatra, Peter Lawford, Steve McQueen, Charles Bronson and Gina Lollobrigida
 Yesterday's Enemy (1959) - British movie set in Burma during World War II
 Merrill’s Marauders (1962) - set on the Burma Road during World War II, and actually filmed on the Philippines
 Rangoon Rowdy (1979) - Indian film starring Krishnam Raju and Jaya Prada
 Beyond Rangoon (1995) - depicts events during the 8888 Uprising in 1988. Starring Patricia Arquette
 The Legend of Suriyothai (2001)
 Stealth (2005) - science-fiction action film starring Josh Lucas, Jessica Biel, Jamie Foxx and Sam Shepard. One scene involves the aircraft bombing of a building in Rangoon
 King Naresuan (2007)
 Rambo (2008) - starring Sylvester Stallone
 Burma VJ (2009) - documentary by Anders Ostergaard
 Largo Winch II (2011) - starring Tomer Sisley and Sharon Stone
 The Lady (2011) - biopic about Aung San Suu Kyi directed by Luc Besson, starring Michelle Yeoh as Aung San Suu Kyi and David Thewlis as her husband
 Born Warriors (2016) - documentary shot throughout Burma over two decades focusing on the indigenous fighting sport of Lethwei by Vincent Giordano
 Golden Kingdom (2016) -  a narrative feature film about four orphan boys, novice monks living in a Buddhist monastery in a remote part of Northeast Burma.

See also
 Lists of films based on location

References

External links
 Edith Mirante, Escapist Entertainment: Hollywood Movies of Burma, The Irrawaddy Vol. 12 (March 2004), Issue 3
 Andrew Selth, Populism, Politics and Propaganda: Burma and the Movies, City University of Hong Kong Working Paper Series No. 100 (June 2008)

Myanmar
Myanmar-related lists